Thomas S. Ray (also known as Tom Ray; born September 21, 1954) is an ecologist who created and developed the Tierra project, a computer simulation of artificial life.

In 1975, he and Donald R. Strong were the first to propose the theory of skototropism in an article in the journal Science (190: 804-806), which he later worked into his senior thesis at Florida State University (FSU), after conducting additional experiments.  The thesis was expanded into his Ph.D. thesis at Harvard University. While at FSU, he earned undergraduate degrees in biology and chemistry.

He is currently Professor of Zoology and Adjunct Professor of Computer Science at the University of Oklahoma in Norman. Previously, he was assistant professor and associate professor in the School of Life and Health Sciences at the University of Delaware from 1981 to 1998. 
Tom Ray is also a former member of the International Core War Society.

Cultural references

In The Rise of Endymion, Dan Simmons's conclusion to his famous Hyperion Cantos sci-fi series, it is revealed by the character of Aenea that the TechnoCore originated from a human experiment in which computer programs were allowed to compete for resources (e.g. memory) and evolve accordingly. It is specified that the one responsible for it was Tom Ray, which possibly refers to the biologist's Tierra project.

Selected publications

References

External links
 Thomas S. Ray's web site
 Thomas S. Ray's second website
 Kurzweil's Turing Fallacy
 Mediamatic.net

1954 births
American ecologists
21st-century American zoologists
Researchers of artificial life
University of Oklahoma faculty
University of Delaware faculty
Florida State University alumni
Harvard University alumni
Living people